The women's single sculls competition at the 2016 Summer Paralympics in Rio de Janeiro took place at the Rodrigo de Freitas Lagoon.

Results
The winner of each heat qualify to the finals, remainder goes to the repechage.

Heats

Heat 1

Heat 2

Repechages
First two of each repechage qualify to the finals.

Repechage 1

Repechage 2

Finals

Final B

Final A

References

Women's single sculls
2016 in women's rowing
Women's rowing in Brazil